The Reformed Synod of Denmark is a synod (council) of four Calvinist free church congregations in Denmark. A member of the World Communion of Reformed Churches, it has approximately 700 members.

The current moderator is Sabine Hofmeister. The Synod's office is at Fredericia, in Southern Denmark.

Congregations
Reformed Congregation in Fredericia  (Den reformerte Meighed i Fredericia, sometimes referred to as the French Reformed Church in Fredericia), founded by Huguenots in 1719, 300 members. 
French Reformed Church in Copenhagen, founded 1685, 50 members, has close ties with the French Reformed Church in Stockholm, Sweden (see Swedish Free Church Council).  
German Reformed Church in Copenhagen , founded in 1685, 300 members (primarily Germans, Dutch, Hungarians, Swiss and Americans, but also some Danes).
Korean Reformed Church in Copenhagen, founded in 1989, joined the Synod in 1997, 50 members, led by a Korean pastor.

See also
Charlotte Amalie of Hesse-Kassel (or Hesse-Cassel)
Religion in Denmark

References

External links
Statistics
Outline history of Reformed church in Denmark

Protestantism in Denmark
Members of the World Communion of Reformed Churches
Members of the World Alliance of Reformed Churches
Reformed denominations in Europe

da:Reformert Kirke
sv:Den reformerte Synode i Danmark